Show is a live album by the Chicago noise rock band The Jesus Lizard.  It was recorded at CBGB's in New York City.  It was a joint release by Collision Arts and Warner Bros. subsidiary label Giant Records.
A video was released for the song "Glamorous" and was featured in an episode of Beavis and Butthead, where the teenage duo liked it.

Track listing
 "Glamorous" - 3:19
 "Deaf as a Bat" - 1:42
 "Seasick" - 3:14
 "Bloody Mary" - 2:11
 "Mistletoe" - 1:57
 "Nub" - 2:58
 "Elegy" - 4:01
 "Killer McHann" - 2:59
 "Dancing Naked Ladies" - 2:59
 "Fly on the Wall" - 3:00
 "Boilermaker" - 2:15
 "Puss" - 3:08
 "Gladiator" - 3:50
 "Wheelchair Epidemic" - 2:10 (The Dicks)
 "Monkey Trick" - 4:12

References

The Jesus Lizard albums
1994 live albums